Prey drive is the instinctive inclination of a carnivore to find, pursue and capture prey. The term is chiefly used to describe and analyse habits in dog training.

Aspects
In all predators the prey drive follows an inevitable sequence: Search (orient, nose/ear/eye); Stalk; Chase; Bite (grab-bite, kill-bite); Dissect; Consume. In wolves, the prey drive is complete and balanced, as it utilises the whole range from search to kill, ending in the consumption of the prey.

In different breeds of dog certain steps of these five have been amplified or reduced by human-controlled selective breeding for various purposes.  The "search" aspect of the prey drive, for example, is most valuable in detection dogs such as bloodhounds and beagles. The "eye-stalk" is a strong component of the behaviors used by herding dogs. The "chase" is seen most clearly in racing dogs such as Greyhounds and Lurchers, while the "grab-bite" and "kill-bite" are valuable in the training of terriers.

In many breeds of dog, prey drive is so strong that the chance to satisfy the drive is its own reward, and extrinsic reinforcers, such as a command from a human, are not required to compel the dog to perform the behaviour.

Benefits
In dog training, prey drive can be used as a performative advantage because dogs with strong prey drive are also willing to pursue moving objects such as toys, which can then be used to encourage certain kinds of behavior, such as that of greyhound racing or the speed required in dog agility. Prey drive can be an important component of pet dog training, obedience training and schutzhund as well. Games such as fetch and tug-of-war can be an effective motivator and reward for learning.

Certain aspects of the prey drive can be a disadvantage in some dogs.  In retrievers, for example, the dog is expected to chase prey and bring it back to the human hunter, but not bite or damage it.  Herding dogs must exhibit the stalking and chasing aspects of prey drive, but should have strongly inhibited grab bite and kill bite stages to prevent them wounding stock.  Bull Terriers such as the Staffordshire bull terrier have an amplified grab-bite as they were originally bred to bait bulls (restrain bulls by hanging onto their noses), but never needed to find or stalk the prey.

Degrees
Levels of prey drive often vary substantially in different dogs.  Therefore, a dog with low drive does not make a successful detection or search dog, but a dog who is too high in prey drive may be unsuitable as a pet for a suburban home, as it may become bored and destructive when its high drive is not regularly satisfied.

Balance
Dogs are happiest and most balanced in overall behavior when their prey drive is properly stimulated and satisfied through play. Many professional dog trainers consider the dog bite tug to be an effective training tool in prey drive and "retrieve" skills development.

References

Dog training and behavior
Predation